The men's 110 metres hurdles at the 2022 European Athletics Championships was held at the Olympiastadion on 16 and 17 August.

Records

Schedule

Results

Round 1
First 4 in each heat (Q) and the next 1 fastest  (q) advance to the Semifinals. The 14 highest ranked athletes received a bye into the semi-finals.

Wind:Heat 1: -0.5 m/s, Heat 2: +0.6 m/s, Heat 3: -0.2 m/s

Semifinals
First 2 in each heat (Q) and the next 2 fastest (q) advance to the final.

Wind:Heat 1: -0.2 m/s, Heat 2: -0.1 m/s, Heat 3: -0.3 m/s

Final

References

Hurdles 110 M
Sprint hurdles at the European Athletics Championships